The term Team North America is used in a number of sports to designate a unified team of North American countries in several sports competitions and sports tournaments.

Competitions featuring a North American team

Note that in the above sports there also exist national teams taking part in other competitions

References

See also
 Team Europe
 Team World

Sport in North America
Multinational sports teams